Lackabaun is a townland  north of Castleisland in the parish of Castleisland, County Kerry, in the southwest of Ireland. It covers  acres of hilly upland. There is a national school.

References

Townlands of County Kerry